Ian Joseph Somerhalder (born December 8, 1978) is an American actor. He is known for playing Boone Carlyle in the TV drama Lost, Damon Salvatore in The CW's supernatural drama The Vampire Diaries, and Dr. Luther Swann in Netflix's sci-fi horror series V Wars.

Early life
Ian Joseph Somerhalder was born on December 8, 1978, in Covington, Louisiana, the second of three children of Edna, a massage therapist from Mississippi, and Robert Somerhalder Sr., an independent building contractor. He has an older brother, Robert, and a younger sister, Robyn. His paternal grandfather's biological father, a landowner in England, whose mistress became pregnant, paid off one of his immigrant workers, whose surname was Somerhalder, to marry her and take the newborn baby far away. His paternal grandmother was French. His mother has Irish ancestry; her maternal grandfather was Choctaw. He lived with his mother after his parents divorced when he was 14.

Somerhalder attended Saint Paul's School, a private school in Covington. He embarked on a modeling career from age 10 to 13, and by the age of 17 he decided to go into acting.

Career

In the summer of 2000, Somerhalder starred in the short-lived WB series Young Americans, a spin-off of Dawson's Creek. He played Hamilton Fleming, the son of the dean of a prestigious boarding school. In 2002, Somerhalder played bisexual character Paul Denton in Roger Avary's adaptation of Bret Easton Ellis' novel, The Rules of Attraction, alongside James Van Der Beek, Shannyn Sossamon, and Jessica Biel.

In 2004, Somerhalder scored his breakthrough role when he played Boone Carlyle in Lost. Despite his character's death in the twentieth episode of the first season, he returned to the role of Boone for seven more episodes between 2005 and 2010, including the series finale. He was the first major character to die. Following his departure from the show, ABC signed him to another one-year contract. In 2005, he stated that being a part of Lost was "the greatest experience" of "the greatest year of his life".

In 2009, Somerhalder appeared in the movie The Tournament where he played the role of an assassin participating in a lethal competition with other assassins. He appears in the coffee table book About Face by celebrity photographer John Russo.

In June 2009, Somerhalder was cast in the role of Vampire Damon Salvatore as a series regular in The CW television drama series The Vampire Diaries. The series premiere attracted The CW's highest premiere ratings of any season premiere since the network began in 2006. The series has continued to be the highest-rated series on its channel with both his performance and the show receiving a positive response from critics. He began directing The Vampire Diaries in its third season and produced the series at the start of season 8. He has received several Teen Choice Award's and a People's Choice Award for his participation on the series.

In October 2012, Somerhalder was cast in the film Time Framed, which had begun filming in Los Angeles. In April 2018, he was cast in the role of Dr. Luther Swann as a series regular in the Netflix science fiction horror series V Wars. The series premiered on Netflix on December 5, 2019 and was cancelled in March 2020.

Foundations and causes

Somerhalder was involved in the cleanup after the Deepwater Horizon oil drilling disaster on April 22, 2010. His efforts included cleaning of oiled wildlife and taping public service announcements to let the public know how they could help. Somerhalder also supports the St. Tammany Humane Society, an organization for animal shelter and welfare. On November 13, 2010, he hosted a Bash on the Bayou charity fundraiser for the Society. During the event, Somerhalder was presented with a donation of $11,100 by The Vampire Diaries fandom for his birthday project.

Together with his The Vampire Diaries co-stars Candice Accola and Michael Trevino, Somerhalder supports the It Gets Better Project, which makes it a goal to prevent suicide among LGBT youth associated with The Trevor Project. For his second campaign, Somerhalder teamed up with The Vampire Diaries co-star Paul Wesley to release a limited edition shirt designed by a fan, with the words "Blood Brothers Since 1864." This campaign sold almost 10,000 shirts.

On December 8, 2010, Somerhalder's 32nd birthday, he launched the "Ian Somerhalder Foundation" which he hopes will educate people on the importance of protecting the environment and animals: "Instead of gifts this year, my birthday wish is that we come together and raise funds to support projects that protect our habitat and nurture our furry friends. To spread awareness for his foundation, Somerhalder sponsors and often walks in Mardi Paws, a parade and organization held in his hometown of Covington. He opposes GMO foods and factory farming, and supports ecologist Allan Savory in his crusade to let cows graze in sync with nature to enrich soil, enhance biodiversity, and reverse climate change. In 2011, Somerhalder visited Savory in Africa and announced he was making a documentary about him with the goal of winning him a Nobel Prize.

Somerhalder is also a celebrity campaigner for RYOT, a Los Angeles-based media company known for RYOT.org, its cause-based, take action online news source.

Personal life
Somerhalder had a relationship with his The Vampire Diaries co-star Nina Dobrev from 2010 to 2013. In mid-2014, he began dating actress Nikki Reed. They confirmed their engagement in February 2015 and married on April 26, 2015, in Malibu, California. Their daughter was born on July 25, 2017. On January 9, 2023, they announced that they are expecting their second child.

Somerhalder has remained close friends with his former The Vampire Diaries co-star Paul Wesley, and in 2020, they announced the launch of a straight bourbon whiskey named Brother's Bond Bourbon.

Filmography

Film

Television

Web

As director

Awards and nominations

References

External links

 

1978 births
Living people
20th-century American male actors
21st-century American male actors
American child models
American environmentalists
American male film actors
American male television actors
American people of Choctaw descent
American people of English descent
American people of French descent
American people of Irish descent
American people who self-identify as being of Native American descent
American philanthropists
American LGBT rights activists
Male actors from Louisiana
People from Covington, Louisiana